The Venus of Willendorf is an  Venus figurine estimated to have been made around 25,000–30,000 years ago. It was found on August 7, 1908, by a workman named Johann Veran or Josef Veram during excavations conducted by archaeologists Josef Szombathy, Hugo Obermaier, and Josef Bayer at a Paleolithic site near Willendorf, a village in Lower Austria. It is carved from an oolitic limestone that is not local to the area, and tinted with red ochre. The figurine is now in the Natural History Museum in Vienna, Austria.

Dating
The figure is associated with the Upper Paleolithic Gravettian industry, which dates to between 33,000 and 20,000 years ago. The figure itself is estimated to have been left in the ground around 25,000 years ago, based on radiocarbon dates from the layers surrounding it.

Interpretation and purpose

Similar sculptures, first discovered in the nineteenth and early twentieth centuries, are traditionally referred to in archaeology as "Venus figurines", due to the widely-held belief that depictions of nude women with exaggerated sexual features represented an early fertility deity, perhaps a mother goddess. The reference to Venus is metaphorical, since the figurines predate the mythological figure of Venus by many thousands of years. Some scholars reject this terminology, instead referring to the statuette as the "Woman of" or "Woman from Willendorf".

Very little is known about the Venus origin, method of creation, or cultural significance; however, it is one of numerous "Venus figurines" surviving from Paleolithic Europe. The purpose of the carving is the subject of much speculation. Like other similar sculptures, it probably never had feet, and would not have stood on its own, although it might have been pegged into soft ground. Parts of the body associated with fertility and childbearing have been emphasized, leading some researchers to believe that the Venus of Willendorf and similar figurines may have been used as fertility goddess. The figure has no visible face, her head being covered with circular horizontal bands of what might be rows of plaited hair, or perhaps a type of headdress.

Catherine McCoid and LeRoy McDermott hypothesize that the figurines may have been created as self-portraits by women. This theory stems from the correlation of the proportions of the statues to how the proportions of women's bodies would seem if they were looking down at themselves, which would have been the only way to view their bodies during this period.  They speculate that the complete lack of facial features could be accounted for by the fact that sculptors did not own mirrors. This reasoning has been criticized by Michael S. Bisson, who notes that water pools and puddles would have been readily available natural mirrors for Paleolithic humans.

Stone's source
Research published in 2022 indicates that the closest and most likely source of the oolite used is on the other side of the Alps in northern Italy, near Lake Garda.

While the former has the highest statistical probability, the latter is closer to sites in southern Russia where similarly styled figurines have been found. In either case, this raises questions regarding the mobility of ancient populations.

See also 
Art of the Upper Paleolithic
List of Stone Age art
History of nude art

References

External links 

Christopher L. C. E. Witcombe, "Women in Prehistory:Venus of Willendorf".
Don Hitchcock (Don's Maps): "Venus figures from the Stone Age - The Venus of Willendorf"
The Invisible Sex: Uncovering the True Roles of Women in Prehistory by J.M. Adovasio, Olga Soffer and Jake Page, gives a new 'view' of headdress as possible model for weaving a basket; Lauran Miller review at Salon.com: 
3D model of the Venus of Willendorf in the 3D museum of the Natural History Museum Vienna

 
Archaeological discoveries in Europe
Willendorf
1908 in Austria
Upper Paleolithic Europe
Archaeological discoveries in Austria
Stone Age Austria
Stone sculptures in Austria
Archaeology of Lower Austria
Limestone sculptures
1908 archaeological discoveries
European archaeology